Hero of the Year is a 1987 Polish drama film directed by Feliks Falk. It was entered into the 15th Moscow International Film Festival where it won the FIPRESCI Prize and a Special Prize. The film was selected as the Polish entry for the Best Foreign Language Film at the 60th Academy Awards, but was not accepted as a nominee.

Cast
 Jerzy Stuhr as Lutek Danielak
 Mieczyslaw Franaszek as Zbigniew Tataj
 Katarzyna Kozak as Majka (as Katarzyna Kozak-Paszkowska)
 Piotr Machalica as Editor Tadeusz Odyniec
 Marian Opania as Chief editor
 Miroslawa Marcheluk as Danka Danielak
 Ryszard Kotys as Kazik Danielak
 Boguslaw Sobczuk as Chodkiewicz
 Michal Tarkowski as Romek Hawalka
 Jerzy Fedorowicz as Comrade Kulepa
 Janusz Józefowicz as Dancer Kajtek
 Krzysztof Krupinski as Mr. Karol

See also
 List of submissions to the 60th Academy Awards for Best Foreign Language Film
 List of Polish submissions for the Academy Award for Best Foreign Language Film

References

External links
 

1987 films
1987 drama films
Polish drama films
1980s Polish-language films